An aka-e ( "red picture") is a type of ukiyo-e that is printed entirely or predominantly in red.  Aka-e were said to be talismans against smallpox, especially when they bore images of Shōki the demon queller.  A woodblock print having a significant portion of the design entirely in red may also be considered to be an aka-e.

Gallery

References
 Itō, Kyōko, "Disease Prevention Prints", Daruma, Issue 40, Vol. 10, No. 4, Autumn 2003, 13–27.
 Newland, Amy Reigle, Hotei Encyclopedia of Japanese Woodblock Prints, Amsterdam, Hotei, 2005, p. 418, 
 Ujlaki, Peter, "Aka-e-Talisman Prints", Daruma, Issue 51, Vol. 13, No. 3, Summer 2006, p. 53.

Ukiyo-e genres